Quercus robusta, also called robust oak, is a rare North American species of oak. It has been found only in the Chisos Mountains inside Big Bend National Park in western Texas.

The bark is black or brown, the twigs dark reddish brown. The tree grows in moist, wooded canyons.

References

External links
Online Plant Guide includes habit photo of cultivated specimen

Trees of the United States
robusta
Flora of Texas
Data deficient plants
Big Bend National Park
Plants described in 1934
Taxonomy articles created by Polbot